The 2021–22 UTSA Roadrunners men's basketball team represented the University of Texas at San Antonio in the 2021–22 NCAA Division I men's basketball season. The Roadrunners, led by sixth-year head coach Steve Henson, played their home games at the Convocation Center in San Antonio, Texas as a member of Conference USA's West Division.

Previous season
The Roadrunners finished the 2020–21 season 15–11, 9–7 in C-USA play to finish in fourth place in the West Division. In the C-USA tournament, they defeated Charlotte in the second round, before falling to Western Kentucky in the quarterfinals.

Offseason

Departures

Incoming transfers

Class of 2021 recruits

Roster

Schedule and results

|-
!colspan=12 style=| Non-conference regular season

|-
!colspan=9 style=| Conference USA tournament

Source

See also
 2021–22 UTSA Roadrunners women's basketball team

References

UTSA Roadrunners men's basketball seasons
UTSA Roadrunners
UTSA Roadrunners men's basketball
UTSA Roadrunners men's basketball